The Guardistallo massacre was a Nazi German act of reprisal that took place close to Guardistallo, in Tuscany. On 29 June 1944, 57 people were killed and buried in a mass grave. One of the victims died from wounds suffered in the same occasion a few days afterward.

The cause of the massacre was suspected at the time to be a belief by German forces that Italian partisans had been hiding an American pilot who had been shot down in the area. A photoreconnaissance pilot from the 3rd Photorecon Group, 12th Air Force had, in fact, been downed by antiaircraft fire in the proceeding days and hidden by a resistance cell.  He was successfully returned to Allied forces and survived the war.

References

Massacres in Italy
1944 in Italy
History of Tuscany
World War II massacres
Mass murder in 1944
Massacres committed by Nazi Germany
Nazi war crimes in Italy